Ariana Afghan Airlines Flight 202, a Douglas DC-4, registration YA-BAG, was an international scheduled flight from Lebanon, bound for Afghanistan with scheduled stops at Mehrabad Airport, Iran and Kandahar International Airport, Afghanistan. On November 21, 1959, two minutes after takeoff, the aircraft crashed into the side of a hill in Aramoun near Beirut. A small cabin fire erupted shortly after the crash, killing 24 of the 27 passengers on board. The 3 surviving passengers were taken to a hospital in Beirut. Two of them later died at the hospital.

Cause
The investigation found that the day before, after a flight from Frankfurt, the flight was delayed for 20 hours due to technical difficulties. Two causes were proposed: 
A navigational error in that the pilot did not right execute a right turn as early as he should have, either because he forgot or was distracted by some unusual occurrence.
A fire in the No. 1 engine, which induced the pilot to start emergency actions with a resulting reduction in the rate of turn and climb.

References

External links

Aviation accidents and incidents in 1959
Accidents and incidents involving the Douglas DC-4
Ariana Afghan Airlines accidents and incidents
Aviation accidents and incidents in Lebanon
1959 in Lebanon